Remembering – Part 1 is a compilation album by rock group Thin Lizzy, one of the first compilations of the band's early years with Eric Bell, released by their record company at that time, Decca Records, in an apparent attempt to cash in on the chart success Lizzy had recently begun enjoying with Vertigo. It includes "Sitamoia" and "Little Darling", both featuring Gary Moore during his first brief stint with the group, the first of which was previously unreleased. The time frame of the album stretches from 1971 to 1974. The album was issued in the US as Rocker (1971-1974) in 1977 by London Records, with the song "Honesty Is No Excuse" instead of "A Song for While I'm Away".

The album was known simply as Remembering in Germany, where it was released as a 27-track double album.

Track listings

 Sitamoia is credited differently in various place, either to Lynott or Downey. Unconfirmed is that Lynott made Downey a birthday gift of the writing credit

Remembering (German double LP)
All tracks written by Phil Lynott unless stated.
Side 1
 "Remembering"
 "The Rise and Dear Demise of the Funky Nomadic Tribes" (Lynott, Bell, Downey)
 "Buffalo Gal"
 "I Don't Want to Forget How to Jive"
 "Sarah"
 "Brought Down"

Side 2
 "Randolph's Tango"
 "Chatting Today"
 "Baby Face"
 "Call the Police"
 "Shades of a Blue Orphanage"
 "Broken Dreams" (Lynott, Bell, Downey)
 "Old Moon Madness"

Side 3
 "Black Boys on the Corner"
 "The Friendly Ranger at Clontarf Castle" (Bell, Lynott)
 "Honesty Is No Excuse"
 "Diddy Levine"
 "Ray-Gun" (Bell)
 "Look What the Wind Blew In"
 "Sitamoia"

Side 4
 "Eire"
 "Return of the Farmers Son"
 "Clifton Grange Hotel"
 "Saga of the Ageing Orphan"
 "Dublin"
 "Things Ain't Working But Down at the Farm" 
 "Remembering (Part 2)"

(NB Side 4 Track 6 "... But Down ..." is a sleeve error and the song is " ... Out Down ...")

Personnel
Thin Lizzy
Phil Lynott – bass guitar, vocals, acoustic guitar, associate producer
Eric Bell – guitars (except tracks 5 & 6)
Brian Downey – drums, percussion
Gary Moore – guitars and backing vocals on tracks 5 & 6

Additional musicians
Fiachra Trench – string arrangement on track 2
Ivor Raymonde – mellotron on track 6

Production
Nick Tauber – producer
Frank Rodgers - executive producer
Jim Fitzpatrick - cover art

References

1976 compilation albums
Thin Lizzy compilation albums
Decca Records compilation albums